Leonid Davidovich Bershidsky (born November 23, 1971) is a Russian journalist, publisher and columnist for Bloomberg View, the editorial division of Bloomberg News. He is currently based in Berlin, Germany.

Biography
Bershidsky was born in Moscow to a Jewish family.  He studied at, but did not finish, the Moscow State Linguistic University and the University of California. He spent a year in France on his MBA from INSEAD in Fontainebleau, France.

In the late 1980s and early 1990s, he worked at The Philadelphia Inquirer, Newsweek, The Moscow Times, and was the chief editor of "Capital" weekly. From 1999 to 2002, he was the first editor in chief of the newspaper Vedomosti.

In 2009, Bershidsky became a co-owner and chief editor of the business website Slon.ru. In 2010, he was appointed director of the business book division of Eksmo, a Moscow book publisher. He became the author of several novels in the genre of art-detective: Rembrandt must die (2011), Devil's Trill, or test Stradivari (2011), Eight Faberge (2012). In 2011, Bershidsky retired from Slon.ru and began working in the Ukrainian magazine consultant project "Focus." In 2012, he edited the Ukrainian web portal Forbes.ua. In 2014 after the Russian annexation of Crimea, Bershidsky announced his emigration to Germany.

References

1971 births
Living people
Russian male journalists
Businesspeople from Moscow
Russian Jews
Russian emigrants to Germany